Amdoun (Arabic: عمدون), also called Zahret Medien is a town and commune in the Béja Governorate, Tunisia. As of 2004, it had a total population of 4,960.

See also
List of cities in Tunisia

References

Populated places in Tunisia
Communes of Tunisia
Populated places in Béja Governorate
Tunisia geography articles needing translation from French Wikipedia